Éric Jacques Levisalles, stagename Eric Lévi (Paris, 1955) is a French rock musician and film composer.

In 1975, Eric Lévi founded the hard rock band Shakin' Street with Fabienne Shine, which would release the two albums Vampire Rock and Solid as a Rock. Shakin' Street briefly toured with AC/DC and the Blue Öyster Cult before disbanding in 1981. He then moved to New York, and back to Paris in 1992. 

Later on in his career, Eric Lévi wrote the musical score to several films, including L'Opération Corned-beef the comedy Les Visiteurs which was an international success and one of the highest-grossing films of all time in France, and La Vengeance d'une Blonde. Levi wrote the end-credit song People And Places for La Vengeance d'une Blonde with Philip Bailey and Roxanne Seeman. People And Places was recorded by Dee Dee Bridgewater and Philip Bailey for the film soundtrack. It was released as a single and on the soundtrack album as a single, club mix, and instrumental version.

Lévi is best known for being the mastermind behind the musical project ERA, and for inventing the Latin-sounding words of these songs. Era's self-titled debut album in 1997 proved to be a hit, becoming the most exported French album with over 6 million copies sold. A sequel, Era 2 was released in 2000, followed by Era: The Mass in 2003. The trilogy is characterized by a mixture of rock, synth, and pseudo-Latin Gregorian chant.

References

External links
 Official Era Site
 Official Shakin' Street site
 Alternative Forum of Era & News
 
 About Eric Levi including picture and full name
 An investigation into ERA music
 Bio and contemporary image
https://www.youtube.com/watch?v=kHufRFdyl0I

1955 births
Living people
French musicians
French expatriates in England